Arkarua adami is a small, Precambrian disk-like fossil with a raised center, a number of radial ridges on the rim, and a five-pointed central depression marked with radial lines of five small dots from the middle of the disk center. Fossils range from 3 to 10 mm in diameter.

Arkarua is known only from the Ediacaran beds of the Flinders Ranges in South Australia.  The generic name refers to Arkaroo, a giant snake from the Dreaming of the local Aboriginal people.

Classification
All known specimens of Arkarua are casts that give no clue to the internal structure, making classification problematic.  Because of Arkarua's pentamerous symmetry, it is tentatively placed within phylum Echinodermata.  Because of its flattened disk- or button-shape, coupled with its pentamerous symmetry, some claim that it can be further classified into the Edrioasteroidea, a class of the echinoderms.

This identification remains suspect, as the fossils do not appear to have either madreporites, or plates of stereom, a unique crystalline form of calcium carbonate from which echinoderm skeletons are built.  These two features are diagnostic of all other echinoderms, as all extinct and extant echinoderms have either one, the other, or both features present.

See also
 List of Ediacaran genera

References

External links 
 Vendian animals: Arkarua from the Ediacara Hills of Australia, from the University of California Berkeley Museum of Paleontology. (pictures)

Ediacaran life
Prehistoric invertebrates of Australia
Enigmatic prehistoric animal genera
Edrioasteroidea